God Created the Integers: The Mathematical Breakthroughs That Changed History is a 2005 anthology, edited by Stephen Hawking, of "excerpts from thirty-one of the most important works in the history of mathematics."

The title of the book is a reference to a quotation attributed to mathematician Leopold Kronecker, who once wrote that "God made the integers; all else is the work of man."

Content
The works are grouped by author and ordered chronologically. Each section is prefaced by notes on the mathematician's life and work. The anthology includes works by the following mathematicians:

Selections from the works of Euler, Bolyai, Lobachevsky and Galois, which are included in the second edition of the book (published in 2007), were not included in the first edition.

Editions

References

2005 non-fiction books
Books by Stephen Hawking
History of mathematics
Mathematics books
Running Press books